The Congregational Church (also known as the First Congregational Church of Montclair) is a historic church at 40 S. Fullerton Avenue in Montclair, Essex County, New Jersey, United States.

Dedicated in 1916, the church was designed by Bertram Grosvenor Goodhue. It was added to the National Register of Historic Places in 1988.

See also 
 National Register of Historic Places listings in Essex County, New Jersey

References

Churches in Essex County, New Jersey
Montclair, New Jersey
United Church of Christ churches in New Jersey
Churches on the National Register of Historic Places in New Jersey
Churches completed in 1920
National Register of Historic Places in Essex County, New Jersey
Bertram Goodhue church buildings
Gothic Revival church buildings in New Jersey
New Jersey Register of Historic Places
Congregational churches in New Jersey
1920 establishments in New Jersey